The Sailing at the 1987 Southeast Asian Games was held between 15 September to 18 September at Ancol Sports Complex.

Medal summary

Men's

Yachting

Boardsailing

Women's

Yachting

Medal table

References
 https://news.google.com/newspapers?nid=x8G803Bi31IC&dat=19870916&printsec=frontpage&hl=en
 http://eresources.nlb.gov.sg/newspapers/Digitised/Article/straitstimes19870918-1.2.48.21.7
 https://eresources.nlb.gov.sg/newspapers/Digitised/Article/straitstimes19870919-1.2.56.21

1987 Southeast Asian Games